Atish Chandra Sinha (11 July 1940 – 4 March 2010) was a minister and Leader of the Opposition in the Indian state of West Bengal. Physicist Bikash Sinha is his cousin.

Early life
The son of Bimal Chandra Sinha, scion of the Kandi Raj family and a minister in the Bidhan Chandra Roy cabinet, Atish Chandra Sinha was born in the Kandi Raj family on 11 July 1940. A brilliant scholar of Presidency College, Kolkata, he specialized in Geophysics from the Imperial College in London.

In politics
He joined politics in the 1960s. He was elected to the state assembly as a Congress candidate from Kandi in 1971, 1972, 1977, 1982, 1991, 1996 and 2001. He was elected to the Indian Parliament from Baharampur (Lok Sabha constituency) in 1984.

He was minister of small scale and cottage industries from 1972 to 1977. He was Leader of the Opposition in the West Bengal Legislative Assembly from 1996 to 2001 and was leader of the Congress legislative party in the West Bengal assembly from 2001 to 2006. As a result of differences with Adhir Ranjan Chowdhury within the Congress Party, he joined Trinamool Congress in 2006.

From 2002 onwards, he was ill off and on but did not give up active politics. He was involved in many social activities. He established the Bimal Chandra College of Law in Kandi in the memory of his father, Bimal Sinha. He died at his Kolkata residence on 4 March 2010.

Other activities
He was an active member of Calcutta South Club, whose obituary says of him "A member of the Royal family of Kandi in West Bengal, he was a very active politician of the Congress party. He was a cabinet minister in the Government of West Bengal when Shri Siddhart Shankar Ray was the Chief Minister, Member of Parliament and leader of opposition in the State Assembly of West Bengal. ...He has been an Executive Committee Member and Vice President of the club for several years. He had been on the Davis Cup Working Committees of the club."

References

Indian National Congress politicians
Trinamool Congress politicians from West Bengal
People from Murshidabad district
2010 deaths
1940 births
University of Calcutta alumni
West Bengal MLAs 1971–1972
West Bengal MLAs 1972–1977
West Bengal MLAs 1977–1982
West Bengal MLAs 1982–1987
West Bengal MLAs 1991–1996
West Bengal MLAs 1996–2001
West Bengal MLAs 2001–2006
India MPs 1984–1989
Lok Sabha members from West Bengal
State cabinet ministers of West Bengal
Leaders of the Opposition in West Bengal
Bengali Hindus